The Extraordinary and Plenipotentiary Ambassador of Peru to the Republic of Cuba is the official representative of the Republic of Peru to the Republic of Cuba.

Peru and Cuba established relations in 1902. After the Cuban Revolution, relations continued, but their troubled nature led to Peru to sever diplomatic relationships on December 30, 1960. After the establishment of Juan Velasco Alvarado's Revolutionary Government, Peru reestablished its relations with Cuba on 8 July 1972, which have remained since.

List of representatives

Representatives (1902–1960)

Representatives (1972–present)

References

Cuba
Peru